Wilder De Ayr Foster (January 8, 1819 – September 20, 1873) was a politician from the U.S. state of Michigan.

Biography
Foster was born in Orange County, New York where he attended the common schools. He moved to Michigan in 1837, and engaged in the hardware business at Grand Rapids in 1845. He was city treasurer and member of the board of aldermen and then became Mayor of Grand Rapids in 1854.  He was a member of the Michigan Senate in 1855 and 1856 and was again mayor of Grand Rapids in 1865 and 1866.

In a special election on April 4, 1871, Foster was elected as a Republican from Michigan's 4th congressional district to the 42nd United States Congress to fill the vacancy caused by the resignation of Thomas White Ferry. (Foster defeated Ferry's brother William, who ran as the Democratic nominee.) In 1872, after new district boundaries were drawn, Foster was reelected to a full term in the 43rd Congress from Michigan's 5th congressional district. In all, Foster served in Congress from December 4, 1871, until his death in Grand Rapids. He is interred there in Fulton Street Cemetery.

See also
List of United States Congress members who died in office (1790–1899)

References

The Political Graveyard

1819 births
1873 deaths
Mayors of Grand Rapids, Michigan
Republican Party Michigan state senators
Republican Party members of the United States House of Representatives from Michigan
19th-century American politicians